Acetylcholine receptor subunit gamma is a protein that in humans is encoded by the CHRNG gene.

For background information on the acetylcholine receptor (AChR), see CHRNA1 (MIM 100690). Two forms of AChR are found in mammalian skeletal muscle cells. The mature form is predominant in innervated adult muscle and the embryonic form is present in fetal and denervated muscle. Embryonic and mature AChR differ by the replacement of the gamma subunit in the pentameric glycoprotein complex by its isoform, the epsilon subunit (MIM 100725), which is specific to the mature AChR subtype. This switch is mediated by ARIA (acetylcholine receptor-inducing activity; MIM 142445).[supplied by OMIM]

References

External links

Further reading

Ion channels
Nicotinic acetylcholine receptors